The 2019 NCAA Division III men's basketball tournament was a single-elimination tournament to determine the national champion of men's NCAA Division III college basketball in the United States. Featuring sixty-four teams, it began on March 1, 2019, following the 2018–19 season, and concluded with the championship game on March 16, 2019.

The national semifinal and championship rounds was held for the first time at the Allen County War Memorial Coliseum in Fort Wayne, Indiana. The tournament was won by the UW–Oshkosh Titans.

Qualifying teams

Automatic bids (43)
The following 43 teams were automatic qualifiers for the 2019 NCAA field by virtue of winning their conference's automatic bid (except for the UAA, whose regular-season champion received the automatic bid).

At-large bids (21)

The following 21 teams were awarded qualification for the 2018 NCAA field by the NCAA Division III Men's Basketball Committee. The committee evaluated teams on the basis of their win–loss percentage, strength of schedule, head-to-head results, results against common opponents, and results against teams included in the NCAA's final regional rankings. By rule, one bid is reserved for teams in Pool B, which are unaffiliated or whose conference does not yet qualify for an automatic bid (e.g. the Atlantic East Conference).

Tournament bracket

Top-left

Bottom-left

Top-right

Bottom-right

Final Four

See also
 2019 NCAA Division I men's basketball tournament
 2019 NCAA Division II men's basketball tournament
 2019 NCAA Division I women's basketball tournament
 2019 National Invitation Tournament
 2019 Women's National Invitation Tournament
 2019 NAIA Division I men's basketball tournament
 2019 NAIA Division II men's basketball tournament
 2019 NAIA Division I women's basketball tournament

References

NCAA Division III men's basketball tournament
Ncaa Tournament
NCAA Division III Men's Basketball
Sports in Fort Wayne, Indiana